Jakob Andrew Hessenthaler (born 20 April 1994) is an English professional footballer who plays as a midfielder for National League side Woking, on loan from  club Crawley Town.

He initially came through the youth academy at Chelsea, before later turning professional with Gillingham. He went on to play 181 times over a five-year stay that also brought loan spells with non-league sides Merstham, Lewes, Tamworth and Margate. He joined Grimsby Town where he remained for several seasons before joining Crawley Town in 2020.

Career

Gillingham
Born in Gravesend, Kent, Hessenthaler began his career with Chelsea as an Under-8 in their youth system and was 15 when Chelsea released him after seven years with the club.

He signed his first professional contract with Gillingham in February 2013. In January 2013, Hessenthaler signed for Merstham on loan. After loan spells with non-League clubs Lewes, Tamworth and Margate, he made his debut for Gillingham on 30 November 2013 as an 85th minute substitute in a 4–1 away league loss to Rotherham.

On 7 February 2014, Hessenthaler signed a new long-term deal at Gillingham to keep him contracted until the end of the 2017–18 season. He scored his first goal for Gillingham in a 4–2 win at home to Coventry City on 11 March 2014, with a 40-yard strike in the 90th minute. His goal against Coventry earned him Gillingham's 'Goal of the Season' award, whilst he also won the club's 'Young Player of the Year' award for the 2013–14 season.

Grimsby Town
He was released by Gillingham at the end of the 2017–18 season and signed a two-year contract with Grimsby Town on 25 June 2018. He scored his first goal for Grimsby in a 2–1 EFL Trophy win over Notts County on 4 September 2018.

On 28 January 2020, he suffered a punctured lung, a broken rib, and ligament damage across the shoulder and collarbone as a result of a challenge by Simeon Jackson in the first minute of a 3–1 victory over Stevenage.

Crawley Town
Hessenthaler was released by Grimsby at the end of the 2019–20 season. On 1 September 2020, he signed for fellow League Two side Crawley Town. He scored his first goal for Crawley on 30 January 2021 in a 3–1 defeat against Cambridge United.

On 31 January 2023, Hessenthaler joined National League club Woking on loan until the end of the season.

Personal life
Hessenthaler is the son of former Gillingham player and manager Andy Hessenthaler, the nephew of Darren Hare, who has worked as the club's youth team manager, and the cousin of former Gillingham teammate Josh Hare.

Honours 
Individual

 Gillingham Young Player of the Season: 2013–14

Career statistics

References

External links
Jake Hessenthaler profile at the Grimsby Town F.C. website
Jake Hessenthaler profile at the Gillingham F.C. website
Jake Hessenthaler profile at the Margate F.C. website
Soccerbase profile

1994 births
Living people
Sportspeople from Gravesend, Kent
Footballers from Kent
English footballers
Isthmian League players
English Football League players
National League (English football) players
Gillingham F.C. players
Lewes F.C. players
Tamworth F.C. players
Margate F.C. players
Grimsby Town F.C. players
Crawley Town F.C. players
Woking F.C. players
Association football midfielders